National Athletic Center Glyfada Makis Liougas, commonly known as Glyfada Indoor Hall (Greek: Εθνικό Αθλητικό Κέντρου Γλυφάδας Ματθαίος Λιούγκας) is an indoor arena that is located in Glyfada, Athens, Greece. Its current total seating capacity is 3,500 people, of which 2,270 seats are permanent, and 1,228 are collapsible. The arena is mainly used to host volleyball, handball, and basketball games.

History
Glyfada Indoor Hall opened in 1970. It was the largest indoor arena in Athens until 1985, when the Peace and Friendship Stadium was inaugurated. Over the years, the arena has been used by: Panathinaikos B.C., Panathinaikos V.C., Olympiacos B.C., Panionios B.C., Ikaros Kallitheas B.C., Olympiacos Women's Basketball, the Greek women's national basketball team, and the Greek women's national volleyball team.

The arena was completely renovated and remodeled in 2022.

References

External links
Image 1 of the interior of National Athletic Center Glyfada Makis Liougas
Image 2 of the interior of National Athletic Center Glyfada Makis Liougas
Image 3 of the interior of National Athletic Center Glyfada Makis Liougas
Image 4 of the interior of National Athletic Center Glyfada Makis Liougas
Information on the arena @ Stadia.gr

Indoor arenas in Greece
Basketball venues in Greece
Panionios B.C.
Sports venues in Attica
Volleyball venues in Greece
Glyfada
Handball venues in Greece